Commonwealth rankings in Athletics – 2014 lists the Top 10 Commonwealth athletes in each event included in the 2014 Commonwealth Games for the Calendar year 2014. Only outdoor performances are included. Rankings are based on a maximum of 3 athletes per country, athletes with a superior performance than the 10th ranked athlete but are not in the top 3 from their country are listed in italics. Athletes who are ineligible to compete at the Commonwealth Games are excluded.

100 metres

200 metres

400 metres

800 metres

1500 metres

5000 metres

10000 metres

110/100 metres hurdles

400 metres hurdles

3000 metres steeplechase

Marathon

4x100 metres Relay

4x400 metres Relay

High jump

Pole vault

Long jump

Triple jump

Shot put

Discus throw

Hammer throw

Javelin throw

Decathlon/Heptathlon

See also
List of Commonwealth records in athletics
List of Commonwealth Games records in athletics
Athletics at the 2014 Commonwealth Games

References

External links
IAAF Records and Lists

 
2014
2014 Commonwealth Games events
Commonwealth Games